Rudolf Lindt (16 July 1855 – 20 February 1909), often known by his francized name Rodolphe Lindt, was a Swiss chocolate maker, chocolatier and inventor. He founded the Lindt brand of Swiss chocolate and invented the conching machine and other processes to improve the quality of chocolate.

Life 
Lindt was born on 16 July 1855 in Bern, to pharmacist and politician Johann Rudolf Lindt and his wife Amalia Eugenia Salchli. Between 1873 and 1875 he did an apprenticeship in Lausanne with the Amédée Kohler & Fils chocolate company, then managed by the sons of Charles-Amédée Kohler. In 1879 he founded his own chocolate factory in the Mattequartier, a section of the Old City of Bern.

In December 1879 he succeeded in improving the quality of chocolate by the development of the conching machine, a lengthwise stirring device which gives a finer consistency and lets undesired aromas evaporate. He was among the first chocolate makers to add cocoa butter back into the chocolate mass. These two innovations contributed greatly to the high quality of Swiss chocolate.

In 1899 Lindt sold his factory and the secret of conching to the Chocolat Sprüngli AG, who have traded as Chocoladefabriken Lindt & Sprüngli AG since. Sprüngli paid 1.5 million Gold francs for the marketing rights and the recipe.

Sources 
 
 Alex Capus: Patriarchen: Zehn Portraits. Albrecht Knaus Verlag, München 2006,

References

1855 births
1909 deaths
People from Bern
19th-century Swiss businesspeople
19th-century Swiss inventors
Swiss chocolatiers